Vänstersocialistiska Partiet was a left-wing political party in Sweden that existed between 1940 and 1963.

Albin Ström was a leftwing Social Democrat from Göteborg that broke out of the Social Democratic Party in 1934. With him followed thousands of other Social Democrats from the West Coast-region. The tendency of Ström founded the daily Arbetarposten (Workers' Mail) and quickly unified itself with the "SKP" of Karl Kilbom and Nils Flyg. Together they formed Socialistiska Partiet. When SP, under the leadership of Nils Flyg, gradually orientated itself towards Nazism, many of its members left the party. The tendency of Ström broke away in 1940 and formed Vänstersocialistiska Partiet, after that Flyg had promoted that the SKP were to be suppressed by the state. VSP became very much centered on Ström and his group in Göteborg.

Arbetarposten was the main organ of VSP, with Ström as its editor. The paper had been founded in 1934. During the war it suffered from several persecutions from the government and the paper was confiscated 24 times. During the war it had an edition of around 1000. After the war the edition rose to around 1500. The paper was mainly distributed in Göteborg, and to a lesser degree in Borås. Arbetarposten ceased publication in 1961. When Ström died in 1963 the party was dissolved.

In 1945 a group of VSP militants, including Evald Höglund (who later formed the trotskyist RSP) and Anton Nilson, broke out as they thought that the party had slipped in a pro-Western Bloc direction.

1940 establishments in Sweden
1963 disestablishments in Sweden
Political parties established in 1940
Defunct socialist parties in Sweden
Political parties disestablished in 1963